Berndt is a surname and can refer to:
Arthur Berndt
Bruce C. Berndt
Catherine Berndt
Doug Berndt
Jerry Berndt
John Berndt
Jule Berndt, American Lutheran clergyman and politician
Helmut Berndt
Marianne Berndt
Ronald Berndt
Sonja Berndt, American pharmacologist and cancer epidemiologist 
Walter Berndt
William Berndt, American politician 

Berndt can also be a given name:
Berndt Ekholm
Berndt Sköldestig

Surnames from given names